
This is a list of aircraft in alphabetical order by manufacturer beginning with K.

K

K & S
(Kate & Stan McLeod)
 K & S Jungster I
 K & S Jungster II
 K & S SA 102 Point 5 Cavalier

K & W
see: EKW

Kaddy 
(Douglas Kaddy, West Groton, CT)
 Kaddy 1934 Monoplane

Kadiak 
(Everett E David, Detroit, MI)
 Kadiak KC-1 Speedster

Kaess 
(Kaess Aircraft Engr Co, NJ)
 Kaess CL-1

Teruo Kago
(Teruo Kago)
 Teruo Kago TK-1

KAI
(Kazan Aviation Institute)
 KAI-1
 KAI-2
 KAI-3/UPB
 KAI-13
 KAI-15
 KAI-16

KAI 
Korea Aerospace Industries Ltd. (commonly referred to as KAI, Korean: 한국항공우주산업, Hanja: 韓國航空宇宙産業)
 KAI KT-1 Woongbi
 KAI KC-100 Naraon
 KAI T-50 Golden Eagle
 KAI KUH-1 Surion

Kairys
(Jurgis Kairys)
 Kairys JUKA

Kaiser 
(Daniel (or Donald?) Kaiser, Chicago, IL)
 Kaiser 1912 Triplane

Kaiser 
(Daniel Kaiser, Milwaukee, WI) (May be Kiser)
 Kaiser Airliner

Kaiser-Fleetwings 
 Kaiser-Fleetwings A-39
 Kaiser-Fleetwings FK
 Kaiser-Fleetwings BQ-2
 Kaiser-Fleetwings BTK

Kaiser-Hammond 
(Kaiser-Stearman Aircraft Co, Oakland, CA)
 Kaiser-Hammond Y-2 Aircar

Kalec 
()
 Kalec 1928 Biplane

Kalgoorlie
 Kalgoorlie Biplane

Kalinauskas, Rolandas
(Rolandas Kalinauskas, Prienai, Lithuania)
Rolandas Kalinauskas RK-1 Swallow
Rolandas Kalinauskas RK-2 Lightning
Rolandas Kalinauskas RK-3 Wind
Rolandas Kalinauskas RK-4 Minija
Rolandas Kalinauskas RK-5 Ruth
Rolandas Kalinauskas RK-6 Magic
Rolandas Kalinauskas RK-7 Orange
Rolandas Kalinauskas RK-8
Rolandas Kalinauskas RK-9 Palanga

Kalinin OKB 
 Aleksandrov-Kalinin AK-1
 Kalinin K-2 
 Kalinin K-3
 Kalinin K-4
 Kalinin K-5
 Kalinin K-6
 Kalinin K-7
 Kalinin K-9
 Kalinin K-10
 Kalinin K-11
 Kalinin K-12
 Kalinin K-13
 Kalinin K-14
 Kalinin K-15
 Kalinin A-2

Kalkert
(Albert Kalkert / Ramor Flugzeugbau)
 Kalkert KE.5
 Kalkert KE.7
 Kalkert KE.8
 Kalkert KE.9
 Kalkert KE.14
 Kalkert Ka 430 (assault glider)

Kam-Craft 
 Kam-Craft Kamvair-2

Kaman 
((Charles H) Kaman Aircraft Corp, Bradley Field, Windsor Locks, CT 1953: Bloomfield, CT 1967: Kaman Corp. 1969: Kaman Aerospace division.)
 Kaman H-2 Seasprite
 Kaman H-22
 Kaman H-43 Huskie
 Kaman HOK
 Kaman HTK Huskie
 Kaman HUK Huskie
 Kaman HU2K Seasprite
 Kaman K-16B
 Kaman K-17
 Kaman K-125
 Kaman K-190
 Kaman K-225
 Kaman K-240
 Kaman K-600
 Kaman K-894
 Kaman K-1125, sometimes called Huskie III
 Kaman K-1200
 Kaman K-MAX
 Kaman KSA-100 SAVER

Kamerton-N 
 Kamerton-N Ratnik

Kaminskas 
(Rim (or Ray) Kaminskas, Chino, CA)
 Kaminskas Jungster I
 Kaminskas Jungster II
 Kaminskas Jungster III

Kamov 
 KaSkr-1
 KaSkr-2
 Kamov AK
 Kamov Ka-8
 Kamov Ka-10 "Hat"
 Kamov Ka-15 "Hen"
 Kamov Ka-18 "Hog"
 Kamov Ka-20 "Harp"
 Kamov Ka-22 Vintokryl "Hoop"
 Kamov Ka-25 "Hormone"
 Kamov Ka-26 "Hoodlum-A"
 Kamov Ka-27 "Helix-A"
 Kamov Ka-28 "Helix"
 Kamov Ka-29 "Helix-B"
 Kamov Ka-31 "Helix-E"
 Kamov Ka-32 "Helix-C" and "Helix-D"
 Kamov Ka-37
 Kamov Ka-50 "Hokum-A"
 Kamov Ka-52 "Hokum-B"
 Kamov Ka-56
 Kamov Ka-60
 Kamov Ka-62
 Kamov Ka-90
 Kamov Ka-92
 Kamov Ka-115
 Kamov Ka-126 "Hoodlum-B"
 Kamov Ka-128
 Kamov Ka-136
 Kamov Ka-137
 Kamov Ka-226 "Hoodlum-C"
 Kamov V-50
 Kamov V-60
 Kamov V-80
 Kamov V-100

Kansas City 
(Kansas City Aircraft Co (pres: George or Gordon L Bennett), Richards Field, Kansas City, MO)
 Kansas City A
 Kansas City Cabin

Kanter-Moissant
 Kanter-Moissant monoplane

Kapferer
(Henry Kapferer)
 Kapferer Paulhan n°3

Kappa 77 
 Kappa 77 KP 2U-SOVA

Kaproni Bulgarski 
(Caproni Bulgara SA / Samoletna Fabrika Kaproni Bulgarski)
 Kaproni Bulgarski KB-1 Papillon (Papillon - Butterfly) - (Ca.100)
 Kaproni Bulgarski KB-2A Tchuchuliga (Tchuchuliga - Lark) - (Ca.113)
 Kaproni Bulgarski KB-2UT (Ca.113)
 Kaproni Bulgarski KB-3 Tchuchuliga I (Tchuchuliga I - Lark I) - (Ca.113)
 Kaproni Bulgarski KB-4 Tchuchuliga II (Tchuchuliga II - Lark II) - (Ca.113)
 Kaproni Bulgarski KB-5 Tchuchuliga III (Tchuchuliga III - Lark III) - (Ca.113)
 Kaproni Bulgarski KB-6 Papagal (Papagal -Parrot) - (Ca.309 Ghibli)
 Kaproni Bulgarski KB-11 Fazan (Fazan -Pheasant)
 Kaproni Bulgarski KB-311 Kvazimodo (Ca.311)

Karhumäki 
(Veljekset Karhumäki O/Y / Karhumäen veljekset)
 Karhumäki Karhu 1 Bear 1 
 Karhumäki Karhu 2 Bear 2
 Karhumäki Karhu 3 Bear 3
 Karhumäki Tiira Tern
 Karhumäki Karhu 48B
 Karhumäki ViriMis-pronunciation or misspelling??

 Kari-Keen 
(Kari-Keen Aircraft Inc (founders: Ernest A Arndt, Swen Swanson, W W Wilson, one other unnamed), 509-511 Plymouth St, Sioux City, IA)
 Kari-Keen 60 Sioux coupe
 Kari-Keen 90 Sioux coupe

 Karp 
(Larry Karp, Deer Park, NY)
 Karp Canary hawk

 Kasyaněnko 
(Kasyaněnko / Kievskogo Politiechnicheskogo Instituta - KPI)
 Kasyaněnko KPI-5 a.k.a. No.5

 Kauffman 
(K K Kauffman, Pittsburgh, PA)
 Kauffman A-1

 Kaufmann 
(Charles H Kaufmann, 49 Poinier St, Newark, NJ)
 Kaufmann A

Kaufmann
(Paul Kaufmann)
 Kaufmann n°1

 Kawanishi 
(Kawanishi Kokuki kk - Kawanishi Aircraft Company Ltd.)
 Kawanishi Baika
 Kawanishi F
 Kawanishi G
 Kawanishi K-1
 Kawanishi K-2
 Kawanishi K-3
 Kawanishi K-5
 Kawanishi K-6
 Kawanishi K-7
 Kawanishi K-8
 Kawanishi K-9
 Kawanishi K-10
 Kawanishi K-11
 Kawanishi K-12 Sakura
 Kawanishi K-200
 Kawanishi P
 Kawanishi S
 Kawanishi T
 Kawanishi E5K
 Kawanishi E7K
 Kawanishi E8K
 Kawanishi E10K
 Kawanishi E11K
 Kawanishi E12K
 Kawanishi E13K
 Kawanishi E15K Shiun
 Kawanishi F1K
 Kawanishi G9K
 Kawanishi H3K
 Kawanishi H6K
 Kawanishi H8K
 Kawanishi H11K
 Kawanishi J3K
 Kawanishi J6K
 Kawanishi K6K
 Kawanishi K8K<
 Kawanishi N1K Kyofu, Kyohuu, Shiden, and Shiden-Kai; "Rex"
 Kawanishi Navy Experimental 7-shi Reconnaissance Seaplane
 Kawanishi Navy Experimental 8-shi Reconnaissance Seaplane
 Kawanishi Navy Experimental 9-shi Flying Boat
 Kawanishi Navy Experimental 9-shi Night Reconnaissance Seaplane
 Kawanishi Navy Experimental 9-shi Transport Seaplane
 Kawanishi Navy Experimental 10-Shi Observation Seaplane
 Kawanishi Navy Experimental 11-Shi Advanced Trainer Seaplane
 Kawanishi Navy Experimental 11-shi Night Reconnaissance Seaplane
 Kawanishi Navy Experimental 11-shi Transport Seaplane
 Kawanishi Navy Experimental 12-Shi Two-seat Reconnaissance Seaplane
 Kawanishi Navy Experimental 12-Shi Three-seat Reconnaissance Seaplane
 Kawanishi Navy Experimental 14-Shi Two-seat Reconnaissance Seaplane Shiun
 Kawanishi Navy Experimental 15-Shi Fighter Seaplane Kyohuu
 Kawanishi Navy Experimental 17-Shi Attack Bomber
 Kawanishi Navy Experimental 17-Shi Otsu (B) Type Interceptor Fighter
 Kawanishi Navy Experimental 18-Shi Otsu (B) Type Interceptor Fighter Jinpuu
 Kawanishi Navy Experimental Large-size Transport Flying-Boat Soukuu
 Kawanishi Navy Fighter Seaplane Kyofu
 Kawanishi Navy Interceptor Fighter Shiden
 Kawanishi Navy Interceptor Fighter Shiden Kai
 Kawanishi Navy Training Fighter Shiden Kai Rensen
 Kawanishi Navy Transport Flying Boat Seikuu
 Kawanishi Navy Type 90-2 Flying Boat
 Kawanishi Navy Type 90-3 Reconnaissance Seaplane
 Kawanishi Navy Type 94 Reconnaissance Seaplane
 Kawanishi Navy Type 94 Transport
 Kawanishi Navy Type 96 Transport Flying Boat
 Kawanishi Navy Type 97 Flying Boat
 Kawanishi Navy Type 97 Transport Flying Boat
 Kawanishi Navy Type 0 Primary Trainer Seaplane
 Kawanishi Navy Type 2 Flying Boat
 Kawanishi Navy Type 2 High-Speed Reconnaissance Seaplane

 Kawasaki 
(Kawasaki Kokuki Kogyo Kabushiki Kaisha - Kawasaki Aircraft Engineering Company Limited)
 Kawasaki A-6
 Kawasaki C-1
 Kawasaki C-2
 Kawasaki C-5
 Kawasaki Ka 87
 Kawasaki KAL-1 
 Kawasaki KAL-2
 Kawasaki KAT-1
 Kawasaki KDA-2
 Kawasaki KDA-3
 Kawasaki KDA-5
 Kawasaki KDA-6
 Kawasaki KDC-2
 Kawasaki KDC-5
 Kawasaki KH-4
 Kawasaki KH-7
 Kawasaki-Vertol KV-107-II
 Kawasaki Igo-1-A
 Kawasaki Igo-1-B
 Kawasaki-Salmson 2-A.-2
 Kawasaki-Dornier Do N
 Kawasaki-Dornier Komet Transport
 Kawasaki-Dornier Merkur Transport
 Kawasaki-Dornier Wal Transport Flying-boat
 Kawasaki Experimental KDA-6 Reconnaissance Aircraft
 Kawasaki Experimental KDC-2 Transport
 Kawasaki Experimental Giyu No.3 Flying-boat
 Kawasaki Experimental Carrier Reconnaissance Aircraft
 Kawasaki OH-1
 Kawasaki P-1
 Kawasaki P-2J
 Kawasaki T-4
 Kawasaki-Vertol 107-II
 Kawasaki YPX
 Kawasaki Ki-3
 Kawasaki Ki-5
 Kawasaki Ki-10
 Kawasaki Ki-22
 Kawasaki Ki-28
 Kawasaki Ki-32
 Kawasaki Ki-38
 Kawasaki Ki-45 Toryu
 Kawasaki Ki-48
 Kawasaki Ki-56
 Kawasaki Ki-60
 Kawasaki Ki-61 Hien
 Kawasaki Ki-64
 Kawasaki Ki-66
 Kawasaki Ki-78
 Kawasaki Ki-81
 Kawasaki Ki-85
 Kawasaki Ki-88
 Kawasaki Ki-89
 Kawasaki Ki-91
 Kawasaki Ki-96
 Kawasaki Ki-100
 Kawasaki Ki-102
 Kawasaki Ki-108
 Kawasaki Ki-119
 Kawasaki Ki-147 I-Go Type1 – Ko
 Kawasaki Ki-148
 Kawasaki Ki-174
 Kawasaki Army Experimental Multi-Seat Convoy Fighter
 Kawasaki Army Experimental KDA-3 Fighter
 Kawasaki Army Type Otsu 1 Reconnaissance Aircraft
 Kawasaki Army Type 87 Night Bomber (1927)
 Kawasaki Army Type 88 Reconnaissance Aircraft (1928)
 Kawasaki Army Type 88 Light Bomber (1928)
 Kawasaki Army Type 92 Model 1 Fighter (1932)
 Kawasaki Army Type 92 Model 2 Fighter
 Kawasaki Army Type 93-1 Single-engined Light Bomber (1933)
 Kawasaki Army Type 95 Fighter (1935)
 Kawasaki Army Type 98 Single-engine Light Bomber (1938)
 Kawasaki Army Type 99 Twin-engined Light Bomber (1939)
 Kawasaki Army Type 1 Freight Transport (1941)
 Kawasaki Army Type 2 Two-seat Fighter (1942)
 Kawasaki Army Type 3 Fighter (1943)
 Kawasaki Army Type 4 Assault Aircraft (1944)
 Kawasaki Army Type 4 Night Fighter
 Kawasaki Army Type 4 Two-seat Fighter
 Kawasaki Army Type 5 Fighter (1945)

 Kay 
(Kay Gyroplanes Ltd.)
 Kay Gyroplane 32/1
 Kay Gyroplane 33/1

 Kayaba Industry 
 Kayaba Heliplane
 Kayaba Ka-Go
 Kayaba Ka-1
 Kayaba Ka-2
 Kayaba Ku-2
 Kayaba Ku-3
 Kayaba Ku-4
 Kimura HK-1

 Kazan 
 Kazan Ansat

 Kazyanenko 
(Yevgeny, Ivan and Andrei Kazyanenko)
 Kazyanenko No.5

KB SAT
(Sovremyenne Aviatsyonne Tekhnologii - Modern Aircraft Technologies)
 KB SAT SR-10

 KEA
(Greek: Κρατικό Εργοστάσιο Αεροπλάνων - State Aircraft Factory)
 KEA Chelidon

 Keane 
((Horace) Keane Aeroplanes, North Beach, Long Island NY. c.1921: Acquired rights to ACE (Aircraft Engr Co, NY). c.1925: Keane Aircraft Corp, Keyport NJ. )
 Keane Ace
 Keane HKL-27

 Keen 
(Charles F Keen, Madison, WI)
 Keen Special

Kegel
(Kegel-Flugzeugbau - Kassel / Max Kegel and Fritz Ackermann using the AK logo)
 Kegel Zögling

Keitek
(Keitek srl, Remanzacco, Italy)
Keitek Streamer

 Keleher 
(James Keleher, Fremont, CA)
 Keleher Lark

 Keller 
(Henry S "Pop" Keller, Chicago, IL)
 Keller 1911 Octoplane
 Keller 1925 Monoplane

 Keller 
(Fred Keller, Anchorage, AK)
 Keller Prospector STOL

 Kellett 
((W Wallace & Roderick G) Kellett Autogiro Corporation, Philadelphia, PA)
 Kellett K-1X
 Kellett K-2
 Kellett K-3
 Kellett K-4
 Kellett KD-1
 Kellett KD-10
 Kellett KH-2
 Kellett KH-15
 Kellett G-1
 Kellett H-8
 Kellett H-10
 Kellett H-17
 Kellett O-60
 Kellett R-2
 Kellett R-3
 Kellett R-8
 Kellett R-10

 Kellis 
 Kellis Air-Truck

 Kellner-Béchereau 
(Avions Kellner-Béchereau)
 Kellner-Béchereau 23
 Kellner-Béchereau 28VD
 Kellner-Béchereau 29
 Kellner-Béchereau 30
 Kellner-Béchereau E.1
 Kellner-Béchereau E.4
 Kellner-Béchereau EC.4
 Kellner-Béchereau ED.5
 Kellner-Béchereau E.5
 Kellner-Béchereau E.60

 Kellogg 
(Harold W Kellogg, Ontario, CA)
 Kellogg Monoplane

 Kelly 
(John Henry Kelly, El Dorado, AR)
 Kelly 1930 Monoplane

 Kelly 
(Dudley R Kelly, Versailles, KY)
 Kelly-D

 Kelly 
(Kevin Kelly )
 Kelly Barbara Jean II

KFC
(Kelowna Flightcraft Centre)
 KFC Stretch 580

 Kember 
(Scott Kember, Sacramento, CA)
 Kember Nazgul

 Kendall 
(George C Distel & Ralph A Kendall, Le Sueur, MN)
 Kendall Crescent A

 Kendall 
(Dr. Ridley Kendall)
 Kendall Mayfly

Kennedy
(Kennedy Aeroplanes Limited)
 Kennedy Giant

Kensgaila
(Kensgaila Aircraft Enterprize / Vladas Kensgaila)
 Kensgaila VK-1 Erelis	
 Kensgaila VK-2 	
 Kensgaila K-20 (VK-3)
 Kensgaila VK-3 	
 Kensgaila VK-4 Žuvėdra	
 Kensgaila VK-5
 Kensgaila VK-6	
 Kensgaila VK-7
 Kensgaila VK-8 Ausra
 Kensgaila VK-9
 Kensgaila Arus?

 Kensinger 
(Ned Kensinger, Fort Worth, TX)
 Kensinger KF (a.k.a. Special)
 Kensinger Tater Chip

 Kentucky 
(Kentucky Aircraft Co, Owensboro, KY)
 Kentucky Aircraft Cardinal

 Kenyon 
(Harold & Kenneth Kenyon, Warren, OH)
 Kenyon A

 Kerestesi 
(Charles A Kerestesi, Elgin, IL)
 Kerestesi G-1

 Kerrison 
(Dr Davenport Kerrison, Jacksonville, FL)
 Kerrison 1909 Biplane

 Kersey-Hudgins-Kennedy 
(C C Kersey, James Hudgins, Virgil Kennedy, Ft Worth, TX)
 Kersey-Hudgins-Kennedy 1934 Monoplane

 Kestrel 
(Kestrel Aircraft Co (fdr: Donald L Stroud), Norman, OK)
 Kestrel KL-1
 Kestrel K250

Kestrel Aircraft Company
 Kestrel K-350

 Ketner 
(Ketner Air Coach Co )
 Ketner Air Coach

 Keystone See also: Huff-Daland
 Keystone B-3
 Keystone B-4
 Keystone B-5
 Keystone B-6
 Keystone LB-1
 Keystone LB-3
 Keystone LB-5
 Keystone LB-6
 Keystone LB-7
 Keystone LB-8
 Keystone LB-9
 Keystone LB-10
 Keystone LB-11
 Keystone LB-12
 Keystone LB-13
 Keystone LB-14
 Keystone NK Pup
 Keystone-Loening O-10
 Keystone O-15
 Keystone OK
 Keystone OL
 Keystone-Loening OL
 Keystone PK
 Keystone K-84 Commuter
 Keystone Puffer
 Keystone K-47 Pathfinder
 Keystone K-55 Pronto
 Keystone Pronto
 Keystone K-78 Patrician
 Keystone-Loening K-84 Commuter
 Keystone-Loening K-85 Air Yacht

 KhAI 
(Kharkovskii Aviatsionny Institut - Kharkov Aviation Institute, a.k.a. Kharkivskii Aviatsionny Institut - Kharkiv Aviation Institute)
 Kharkiv KhAI Omega
 Kharkiv KhAI-1
 Kharkiv KhAI-2 (powered sailplane) 
 Kharkiv KhAI-3 (Aviavnito-3) (Sergei Kirov)
 Kharkiv KhAI-4 (Iskra)
 Kharkiv KhAI-5 (Neman R-10)
 Kharkiv KhAI-6
 Kharkiv KhAI-8
 Kharkiv KhAI-12 (Start)
 Kharkiv KhAI-17
 Kharkiv KhAI-18
 Kharkiv KhAI-19
 Kharkiv KhAI-20
 Kharkiv KhAI-22
 Kharkiv KhAI-24
 Kharkiv KhAI-25
 Kharkiv KhAI-26
 Kharkiv KhAI-27
 Kharkiv KhAI-28
 Kharkiv KhAI-29
 Kharkiv KhAI-30 (Professor Nyeman)
 Kharkiv KhAI-32
 Kharkiv KhAI-33
 Kharkiv KhAI-35 (Entuziast)
 Kharkiv KhAI-36
 Kharkiv KhAI-51
 Kharkiv KhAI-52
 Aviavnito-2 (Blohka)
 Aviavnito-8
 Aviavnito-9
 PS-5
 60-let KhAI

 KJ  
 KJ-1 AEWC
 KJ-200
 KJ-2000
 KJ-3000

 KkAZ 
(KkAZ - Kharkov Aviatsionny Zavod - Kharkov State Aviation Plant)
 KkAZ ViS-3
 KkAZ ViS-5
 KkAZ-30
 KkAZ ХАЗ-30

 Khioni 
(Vassili Nikolayevich Khioni)
 Khioni VKh Anadva
 Khioni VKh Anasalya
 Khioni No.4
 Khioni No.5

 KHP 
(Kazan Helicopters Plant, Kazan, Tatarstan)
 KHP Aktai
 KHP Ansat

 Kidd 
(T L Kidd, San Antonio, TX)
 Kidd Adventurer

 Kieger 
(André Kieger)
 Kieger AK.01
 Kieger AK.3

 Kiel 
(Flugzeugbau Kiel G.m.b.H.)
 Kiel FK 166

 Killingsworth 
(Richard Killingsworth, Ft Walton Beach, FL)
 Killingsworth DSK-1 Hawk

 Kimball 
(Kevin Kimball)
 Kimball McCullocoupe

 Kimball 
((Wilbur R) Kimball Aircraft Corp, Naugatuck, CT)
 Kimball 1908 Helicopter
 Kimball 1910 Ornithopter
 Kimball Beetle
 Kimball Tailless

 Kimbell 
(Gene Kimbell, Dimmitt, TX)
 Kimbell 1935 Monoplane

Kimberley
(Gareth J. Kimberley)
 Kimberley Sky-Rider

 Kimbrel 
(Michael J. Kimbrel)
 Kimbrel Dormoy Bathtub Mk.1
 Kimbrel Sorrell SNS-2 Guppy

Kimfly
(Kimfly D.O.O., Vodice, Slovenia)
Kimfly Alpin
Kimfly Light Wing M24
Kimfly Mini Wing Q
Kimfly River

 Kinetic 
(Kinetic Aviation)
 Kinetic Mountain Goat

 King's 
(King's Engineering Fellowship and Angel Aircraft Corp, Orange City IA. )
 King's Angel 44

 Kingsford-Smith 
(Kingsford Smith Aviation Services Pty. Ltd.)
 Kingsford Smith PL.7
 Kingsford Smith KS-3 Cropmaster
 Kingsford Smith Bushmaster
 Kingsford Smith Kingsmith

 Kinman 
(Duane Kinman, Rubidoux, CA)
 Kinman Super Simple I

Kinner
(Kinner Airplane & Motor Corporation)
 Kinner Airster
 Kinner Airster Monoplane
 Kinner Argonaut
 Kinner Playboy
 Kinner Sportster
 Kinner Sportwing
 Kinner Coupe
 Kinner Courier
 Kinner KE-8
 Kinner Monoplane
 Kinner C-7 Envoy
 Kinner CG-14 Invader
 Kinner RK Envoy
 Kinner LXK
 Kinner Navy Experimental Type K Transport

 Kinney 
(Cleveland, OH)
 Kinney HRH

 Kippers 
(Harold M Kippers, Mukwonago, WI)
 Kippers K-1 Land Monoplane

 Kirk 
(Joe Kirk )
 Kirk Skat

 Kirkham 
(Kirkham Aeroplane & Motor Co, Bath, NY)
 Kirkham 1911 Biplane
 Kirkham Air yacht
 Kirkham Racer
 Kirkham Gull

 Kirkham-Williams 
((Charles B) Kirkham and (Alford) Williams, Long Island, NY)
 Kirkham-Williams X
 Kirkham-Williams Mercury I

 Kirsten 
(Prof Frederick K Kirsten, University of WA)
 Kirsten 1934 Cycloidal Flying machine

Kitchen-Lee-Richardssee:Lee-Richards

 Kistler 
(James Kistler )
 Kistler Skeeter (a.k.a. Scholl F-1)
 Kistler Teenie Too (Skeeter reg!!)

Kjeller
(Kjeller Flyvemaskinsfabrik)
Kjeller F.F.6
Kjeller F.F.7 Hauk (Hannover CL.V)
Kjeller F.F.8 Make I
Kjeller F.F.8 Make II
Kjeller F.F.8 Make III
Kjeller F.F.9 Kaje I
Kjeller F.F.9 Kaje II
Kjeller F.F.9 Kaje III
Kjeller PK X-1
Kjeller PK X-2
Kjeller T.2

Kjolseth
(Lt. Col. Paul Kjolseth RNoAF)
 Kjolseth PKX-1 
 Kjolseth PKX-2 refer to :no:Kjeller PK X-2

 Klampher 
(G F Klampher, Wichita, KS)
 Klampher 1930 Monoplane

 Klassen 
(San Francisco, CA)
 Klassen 1910 Gyroplane

 Klein 
(Štefan Klein)
 Klein Aeromobil

 Klemm 
(Leichtflugzeugbau Klemm GmbH)
 Klemm L.17w
 Klemm L.20
 Klemm L.25
 Klemm Kl 25
 Klemm Kl 26
 Klemm Kl 31
 Klemm Kl 32
 Klemm L 33
 Klemm Kl 35
 Klemm Kl 36
 Klemm Kl 105
 Klemm Kl 106
 Klemm Kl 107
 Klemm Kl 151
 Klemm Kl 152 unbuilt fighter project, number reused by Focke-Wulf
 Klemm Doppel-Kl 25
 Klemm Alpha

 Kline 
(Warren Kline, Miami, FL)
 Kline Red Bird

 Klinedorf 
(Karl D Klinedorf, Gary, IN)
 Klinedorf 1936 Monoplane

 KLM 
 KLM&TU Flying V

 Knabenshue 
(Roy Knabenshue, Los Angeles, CA)
 Knabenshue 1910 Biplane

 Knapp
(Frank Knapp, Palmer, AK)
 Knapp Lil cub
 Knapp Cub X

 Knepper 
((Paul H) Knepper Aircraft, Lehighton, PA)
 Knepper KA-1 Crusader
 Knepper KAC-4 Crusader
 Knepper KAC-5 Crusader

 Knight Twister 
(Vernon W Payne, Cicero, IL)
 Knight Twister 1934 prototype
 Knight Twister Junior 75-85
 Knight Twister KT
 Knight Twister KT-50
 Knight Twister KT-75
 Knight Twister KT-80
 Knight Twister KT-90
 Knight Twister KT-95
 Knight Twister Kay-Tee Pursuit
 Knight Twister KT-125
 Knight Twister KTD-2
 Knight Twister KTS-1
 Knight Twister KTT-90
 Knight Twister MC-7
 Knight Twister SKT-1 Sunday Knight Twister

 Knoll 
((Felix W A) Knoll Aircraft Company, 471 W 1st St, Wichita, KS)
 Knoll KN-1
 Knoll KN-2
 Knoll KN-3
 Knoll KN-4
 Knoll KN-5
 Knoll KN-6
 Knoll KN-22

 Knoll 
(Richard Knoll, Ogallala, NE)
 Knoll Z

 Knoll-Brayton 
((Felix W A) Knoll-(---) Brayton Aeronautical Corp, Norwich, CT)
 Knoll-Brayton 1931 Monoplane
 Knoll-Brayton Sachem

Knoller
(Professor Richard Knoller)
 Knoller B.I(Av)
 Knoller B.I(Th)
 Knoller C.I(Ph)
 Knoller C.II(Av)
 Knoller C.II(Lo)
 Knoller C.II(WKF)
 Knoller D.I
 Knoller 30.05
 Knoller 70.01
 Knoller 70.02

 Knöpfli 
(Leo Knöpfli)
 Knöpfli Mini-Stol

 Knowles 
(Gp. Capt. A.S. Knowles)
 Knowles Duet

 Knowlton (aircraft constructor) 
 Knowlton LSP

 Knowlton 
(Donald Knowlton)
 Knowlton Jodette

 Knox 
(E J Knox, Portland, O.)
 Knox Special 4

 Kobe Steel 
 Kobeseiko Te-Gō

 Kochyerigin 
 Kochyerigin LR
 Kochyerigin TSh-3
 Kochyerigin DI-6
 Kochyerigin SR
 Kochyerigin R-9
 Kochyerigin LBSh
 Kochyerigin Sh
 Kochyerigin Sh-2
 Kochyerigin MMSh
 Kochyerigin OPB
 Kochyerigin PS-43
 Kochyerigin Bsh-1

Kocjan
(Antoni Kocjan)
 Kocjan Orlik
 Kocjan Orlik 2 (USAAC - XTG-7)
 Kocjan Orlik 3 Olympic Orlik Kocjan Bąk (horse-fly)
 Kocjan Bąk II
 Kocjan Bąk II bis
 Kocjan Czajka (Lapwing)
 Kocjan Czajka II
 Kocjan Czajka III
 Kocjan Czajka bis
 Kocjan Komar (Gnat)
 Kocjan Sokół
 Kocjan Wrona (Crow)
 Kocjan Wrona bis
 Kocjan Sroka (Magpie)
 Kocjan-Grzeszczyk Mewa
 Kocjan TG-7 (Orlik 2)

 KOD 
(Kara Ostas Darbnica - Latvia)
 KOD-1

Koechlin & Pischoff
  (predecessor to Pivot-Koechlin monoplane)

 Koehl 
(Dr. Hermann Koehl and Ernst Von Loessl)
 Koehl KO-1

 Koehler 
(Harold Koehler, Akron, OH)
 Koehler Air-Roamer 4
 Koehler Racer

 Koenig 
(? Koenig)
 Koenig 04 Tom-Pouss

Kohl
(Stefan Kohl, Kattenes, Germany)
Kohl Mythos

Koivu and Toomey
(Fitchburg, MA)Koivu and Toomey
 Koivu and Toomey 1930 biplane

Kokkola
(Kalevi & Seppo Kokkola)
 Kokkola Ko-3 Nousukas

 Kokusai 
 Kokusai Ki-59
 Kokusai Ki-76
 Kokusai Ki-86
 Kokusai Ki-105 Ohtori
 Kokusai Ku-7
 Kokusai Ku-8
 Kokusai Army Experimental Glider
 Kokusai Army Type 1 Transport
 Kokusai Army Type 3 Command Liaison Plane
 Kokusai Army Type 4 Large Transport Glider
 Kokusai Ta-Go

 Kolb 
((Homer) Kolb Co Inc, Phoenixville, PA)
 Kolb Laser
 Kolb Firefly
 Kolb Firestar
 Kolb Flyer
 Kolb Flyer Powered Parachute
 Kolb Flyer SS
 Kolb Kolbra
 Kolb Mark III
 Kolb Slingshot
 Kolb Ultrastar

 New Kolb Aircraft 
 Kolb Firefly
 Kolb Firestar
 Kolb Flyer
 Kolb Flyer Super Sport
 Kolb King Kolbra
 Kolb Kolbra
 Kolb Mark III
 Kolb Slingshot
 Kolb Ultrastar

Kolitilin-Nikitin
(Ben Kolitilin and Misha Nikitin)
 Kolitilin-Nikitin PJ-II

 KOMTA 
(Kommissii po Tyazheloi Aviatsii - Commission for Heavy Aviation)
 KOMTA

Kompol
(Kompol SC, Swiercze, Poland)
Kompol Jazz

 Kondor 
(Kondor Flugzeugwerke G.m.b.H.)
 Kondor Taube Type H
 Kondor W 1 
 Kondor W 2C
 Kondor B.I
 Kondor D.I (E 3 production)
 Kondor D 1
 Kondor D 2
 Kondor D 6
 Kondor D 7
 Kondor E 3
 Kondor E 3a
 Kondor Dreidekker

Konner
(Konner Srl)
 Konner K1

Konstruktionskontor Nord
(Konstruktionskontor Nord - Flugzeugbau Nord)
 Konstruktionskontor Nord MZF 1
 Konstruktionskontor Nord BKF 1

 Koolhoven 
(Sytse Frederick Willem Koolhoven; see also Armstrong-Whitworth and B.A.T.)

(manufactured at Maatschappij voor Luchtvaart 1911)
 Koolhoven Heidevogel

(Manufactured at Nationale Vliegtuig Industrie - NVI 1922-1926)
 Koolhoven F.K.29 
 Koolhoven F.K.31 
 Koolhoven F.K.32
 Koolhoven F.K.33 
 Koolhoven F.K.34

(manufactured at N.V. Koolhoven Vliegtuigen 1926-1940)
 Koolhoven F.K.30 Toerist
 Koolhoven F.K.35 unflown 
 Koolhoven F.K.36 unbuilt project
 Koolhoven F.K.37 unbuilt project 
 Koolhoven F.K.39 unbuilt project 
 Koolhoven F.K.40 
 Koolhoven F.K.41 
 Koolhoven F.K.42 
 Koolhoven F.K.43 
 Koolhoven F.K.44 Koolmees
 Koolhoven F.K.45 
 Koolhoven F.K.46 
 Koolhoven F.K.47 
 Koolhoven F.K.48 
 Koolhoven F.K.49 
 Koolhoven F.K.50 
 Koolhoven F.K.51 
 Koolhoven F.K.52 
 Koolhoven F.K.53 Junior 
 Koolhoven F.K.54 
 Koolhoven F.K.55 
 Koolhoven F.K.56 
 Koolhoven F.K.57 
 Koolhoven F.K.58 
 Koolhoven F.K.59

 Korchagin 
 Korchagin Yamal

Korean Air
 Korean Air Chang-Gong 91

 Korolyev OKB 
(Sergey P. Korolyov)
 Korolyev RP-1
 Korolyev RP-318
 Korolyev SK-3 Krasnaya Zvezda

 Korsa 
(Flugzeugbau Korsa - Hugo G. Schmid)
 Korsa 1
 Korsa T.2

 Kortenbach & Rauh 
 Kortenbach & Rauh Kora 1

 Korvin 
(V.L.Korvin, N.G.Mikhelson, M.M.Shishmarev - Корвин, Михельсон, Шишмарев)
 Korvin MK-1 Rybka

 Koslowski 
(Charles D Kozlowski, Raritan. NJ)
 Koslowski Short-T

Kostin-Siekerin-Taciturnov
(L. Kostin, L. Siekerin & V. Taciturnov)
 Kostin-Siekerin-Taciturnov Leningradets

Kotliński
(Jerzy Kotliński)
 Kotliński JK-1 Trzmiel

 Koun 
(Young Ho Koun, Roosevelt Field, NY)
 Kouns-Craft

 Kovaks 
(Joseph Kovaks)
 Kovacs K-51 Peregrino

 Kowalke 
(Levern P Kowalke, Wall Lake, IA)
 Kowalke

 Kozlov 
(Sergei G. Kozlov)
 Kozlov PS (Prozrachnyy Samlyot - transparent aircraft)
 Kozlov EI (Eksperimentalnyi Istrebitel - experimental fighter)
 Kozlov Gigant

Kozłowski
(Władysław Kozłowski)
 Kozłowski WK.1 Jutrzenka
 Kozlowski WK.3

 Kraft 
(Phil Kraft)
 Kraft K-1 Super Fli

 KEA 
(KEA: Kratiko Ergostasio Aeroplanon - State Aircraft Factory)
 KEA Chelidon

 Kraemer 
(L A Kraemer, Rapid City, SD)
 Kraemer LK-1 Rapid Rambler
 Kraemer LV-1

 Kraft 
(Phil Kraft, Oceanside, CA)
 Kraft Super Fli

 Kramme & Zeuthen 
(see:-Skandinavisk Aero Industri)
 SAI KZ I
 SAI KZ II
 SAI KZ III
 SAI KZ IV
 SAI KZ VII
 SAI KZ VIII
 SAI KZ X

 Krapish 
((Alexander Peter) Krapish Aircraft Co, Kearny, NJ & Squantum, MA)
 Krapish K-1
 Krapish K-2
 Krapish K-3
 Krapish K-4

Krasniye Kryl'ya
(Taganrog, Russia)
Krasniye Kryl'ya Deltacraft MD-40
Krasniye Kryl'ya Deltacraft MD-50C

 Krauss 
 Krauss TRS-111

 Kreider-Reisner 
((Ammon "Amos" H) Kreider-(Lewis E) Reisner Flying Service. 1927: Kreider-Reisner Aircraft Co, Hagerstown, MD 1929: Acquired by Fairchild Aircraft Corp.)
 Kreider-Reisner A Midget
 Kreider-Reisner C-1
 Kreider-Reisner C-2 Challenger
 Kreider-Reisner C-3 Challenger
 Kreider-Reisner C-4 Challenger
 Kreider-Reisner C-5 Challenger
 Kreider-Reisner C-6 Challenger
 Kreider-Reisner C-7 Challenger
 Kreider-Reisner C-31
 Kreider-Reisner KR-21
 Kreider-Reisner KR-31
 Kreider-Reisner KR-34
 Kreider-Reisner KR-34CA
 Kreider-Reisner KR-35
 Kreider-Reisner KR-125
 Kreider-Reisner KR-135
 Kreider-Reisner XC-31

 Kreit-Lambrickx 
( André Kreit & Lambrickx)
 Kreit Lambrickx KL.2

 Kremp Yu 
 Kremp Yu monoplane

 Kress 
 Kress Drachenflieger

 Kreutzer 
(Joseph Kreutzer Corp, 1801 S Hope St, Los Angeles, CA)
 Kreutzer K-1 Air Coach
 Kreutzer K-2 Air Coach
 Kreutzer K-3 Air Coach
 Kreutzer K-5 Air Coach
 Kreutzer T-6 Air Coach

 Krenzer 
(Frank Krenzer, Holcomb, NY)
 Krenzer

 Krier-Kraft 
(Harold Krier, Wichita, KS)
 Krier-Kraft Acromaster

Krist
(Chester J. Krist)
 Krist Cloud Cutter

Aksel Kristiansen
(Aksel Kristiansen)
 Kristiansen Norge A
 Kristiansen Norge B
 Kristiansen Norge C

Kronfeld
(Robert Kronfeld)
 Kronfeld Vienna
 Kronfeld Austria
 Kronfeld Drone Trainer
 Kronfeld Drone
 Kronfeld Monoplane
 Kronfeld Ground Trainer

Krüger 
(Eric Krüger - or Krueger)
 Krüger EK.51 Welcome
 Krüger two-seater

Krumsiek
(Wilhelm Krumsiek)
 Krumsiek 1909 Aeroplan

Kubicek Aircraft
(Kubicek Aircraft spol s.r.o., Brno, Czech Republic)
Kubicek M-2 Scout
Kubicek AV-1 Hot-air airship/balloon

 Kucher 
(Kucher Airplane Corp, 2206 Valentine Ave, Bronx, NY)
 Kucher Club Plane
 Kucher Red Devil Flivver

Kuhelj
(Dr. ing. Anton Kuhelj)
 Kuhelj LK-1
 Kuhelj TseTse

 Kuhnert 
(Sam W Kuhnert, Camp Hill, PA)
 Kuhnert Photoplane

 Kuhlia
(Mikka Kuhlia)
Kuhlia MK Ia
Kuhlia MK Ib
Kuhlia MK II

 Kurzenberger 
(Richard Kurzenberger, Horsehead, NY)
 Kurzenberger Mini-Stuka

 Kutnar 
(Virgil Kutnar, San Francisco, CA)
 Kutnar Rotorplane

 KWD 
(Kaiserlicht Werft (Danzig))
 K.W. Nos 404-405
 K.W. Nos 467-470
 K.W. Nos 1105-1106
 K.W. No. 1650

 KWK 
(Kaiserlicht Werft (Kiel))
 K.W. Nos 463-466

 KWW 
(Kaiserlicht Werft (Wilhelmshaven)'')
 K.W. Nos 401-403
 K.W. Nos 461-462
 K.W. No. 945
 K.W. No. 947

Kyushu / Watanabe 

(Kyushu Hikoki K.K.)
(some products were manufactured under the Watanabe name)
 Kyūshū K6W WS-103
 Kyūshū WS-103
 Kyushu J7W Shinden
 Kyushu K9W
 Kyushu K10W
 Kyushu K11W Shiragiku
 Kyushu Navy Experimental 14-Shi Basic Land Trainer Kouyou
 Kyushu Navy Experimental 14-Shi Intermediate Land Trainer
 Kyushu Navy Experimental 15-Shi Operational Trainer Shiragiku
 Kyushu Navy Experimental 17-Shi Patrol Bomber Tokai
 Kyushu Navy Experimental 18-Shi Otsu (B) Type Interceptor Fighter Shinden
 Kyushu Navy Experimental Jet-powered Interceptor Fighter Shinden-Kai
 Kyushu Navy Operations Trainer Shiragiku
 Kyushu Navy Patrol Plane Nankai

References

Further reading

External links

 List Of Aircraft (K)